Missing in America is a 2005 drama film, directed, produced, and written by Gabrielle Savage Dockterman. It is based on a story by Ken Miller, a former Green Beret who was a helicopter pilot in the Vietnam War. The film debuted at the Seattle International Film Festival in May 2005.

Plot
Jake (played by Danny Glover), a reclusive Vietnam War veteran, has lived in a cabin in the woods of the Pacific Northwest for 35 years, plagued with guilt over the loss of men under his command. His only interaction with other people is when he drives into town to sell firewood and buy supplies from Kate (played by Linda Hamilton). His life is changed when he is visited by Henry, an ex-platoon member (played by David Strathairn). Henry is dying of lung cancer caused by exposure to Agent Orange, and entrusts the care of his half-Vietnamese daughter, Lenny, to Jake.

Jake refuses, but Henry leaves in the night, leaving Lenny behind and giving Jake little choice but to look after her. Lenny proves troublesome and interrupts Jake's way of life. Over time however, Lenny encourages Jake to reach out to other veterans living nearby in self-imposed isolation.

Cast
Danny Glover as Jake
Ron Perlman as Red
Linda Hamilton as Kate
Zoe Weizenbaum as Lenny
David Strathairn as Henry

References

External links
Official site

2005 films
2005 drama films
2000s English-language films
American drama films